is an action-adventure game developed by Japan Studio and Team Ico, and published by Sony Computer Entertainment, released for the PlayStation 2 video game console in 2001 and 2002 in various regions. It was designed and directed by Fumito Ueda, who wanted to create a minimalist game around a "boy meets girl" concept. Originally planned for the PlayStation, Ico took approximately four years to develop. The team employed a "subtracting design" approach to reduce elements of gameplay that interfered with the game's setting and story in order to create a high level of immersion.

The protagonist is a young boy named Ico who was born with horns, which his village considers a bad omen. Warriors lock him away in an abandoned fortress. During his explorations of the fortress, Ico encounters Yorda, the daughter of the castle's Queen. The Queen plans to use Yorda's body to extend her own lifespan. Learning this, Ico seeks to escape the castle with Yorda, keeping her safe from the shadowy creatures that attempt to draw her back. Throughout the game, the player controls Ico as he explores the castle, solves puzzles and assists Yorda across obstacles.

Ico introduced several design and technical elements, including a story told with minimal dialogue, bloom lighting, and key frame animation, that have influenced subsequent games. Although not a commercial success, it was critically acclaimed for its art, original gameplay and story elements and received several awards, including "Game of the Year" nominations and three Game Developers Choice Awards. Considered a cult classic, it has been called one of the greatest video games of all time, and is often brought up in discussions about video games as an art form. It has influenced numerous video games since its release. It was rereleased in Europe in 2006 in conjunction with Shadow of the Colossus, the spiritual successor to Ico. A high-definition remaster of the game was released alongside Shadow of the Colossus for the PlayStation 3 in The Ico & Shadow of the Colossus Collection in 2011.

Gameplay 

Ico is primarily a three-dimensional platform game. The player controls Ico from a third-person perspective as he explores the castle and attempts to escape it with Yorda. The camera is fixed in each room or area but swivels to follow Ico or Yorda as they move; the player can also pan the view a small degree in other directions to observe more of the surroundings. The game includes many elements of platform games; for example, the player must have Ico jump, climb, push and pull objects, and perform other tasks such as solving puzzles in order to progress within the castle.

These actions are complicated by the fact that only Ico can carry out these actions; Yorda can jump only short distances and cannot climb over tall barriers. The player must use Ico so that he helps Yorda cross obstacles, such as by lifting her to a higher ledge, or by arranging the environment to allow Yorda to cross a larger gap herself. The player can tell Yorda to follow Ico, or to wait at a spot. The player can have Ico take Yorda's hand and pull her along at a faster pace across the environment. Players are unable to progress in the game until they move Yorda to certain doors that only she can open.

Escaping the castle is made difficult by shadow creatures sent by the Queen. These creatures attempt to drag Yorda into black vortexes if Ico leaves her for any length of time, or if she is in certain areas of the castle. Ico can dispel these shadows using a stick or sword and pull Yorda free if she is drawn into a vortex. While the shadow creatures cannot harm Ico, the game is over if Yorda becomes fully engulfed in a vortex; the player restarts from a save point. The player will also restart from a save point if Ico falls from a large height. Save points in the game are represented by stone benches that Ico and Yorda rest on as the player saves the game. In European and Japanese releases, upon completion of the game, the player has the opportunity to restart the game in a local co-operative two-player mode, where the second player plays as Yorda, still under the same limitations as the computer-controlled version of the character.

Plot
, a horned boy, is taken by a group of warriors to an abandoned castle and locked inside a stone coffin to be sacrificed. A tremor topples the coffin and Ico escapes. As he searches the castle, he comes across , a captive girl who speaks a different language. Ico helps Yorda escape and defends her from shadow-like creatures. The pair makes their way through the castle and arrive at the bridge leading to land. As they cross, the Queen, ruler of the castle, appears and tells Yorda that as her daughter she cannot leave the castle. Later, as they try to escape on the bridge, it splits up and they get separated. Yorda tries to save Ico but the Queen prevents it. He ends up falling off the bridge and losing consciousness.

Ico awakens below the castle and makes his way back to the upper levels, finding a magic sword that dispels the shadow creatures. After discovering that Yorda has been turned to stone by the Queen, he confronts the Queen in her throne room, who reveals that she plans to restart her life anew by taking possession of Yorda's body. Ico slays the Queen with the magic sword, but his horns are broken in the fight and at the end of it he is knocked unconscious. With the Queen's death the castle begins to collapse around Ico, but the Queen's spell on Yorda is broken, and a shadowy Yorda carries Ico safely out of the castle to a boat, sending him to drift to the shore alone. Ico awakens to find the distant castle in ruins, and Yorda, in her human form, washed up nearby. She wakes up and smiles at Ico.

Development 

Lead designer Fumito Ueda came up with the concept for Ico in 1997, envisioning a "boy meets girl" story where the two main characters would hold hands during their adventure, forming a bond between them without communication. Ueda's original inspiration for Ico was a TV commercial he saw, of a woman holding the hand of a child while walking through the woods, and the manga series Galaxy Express 999, where a woman is a guardian for the young hero as they adventure through the galaxy, which he thought about adapting into a new idea for video games. He also cited his work as an animator on Kenji Eno's Sega Saturn game Enemy Zero, which influenced the animation work, cinematic cutscenes, lighting effects, sound design, and mature appeal. Ueda was also inspired by the video game Another World (Outer World in Japan), which used cinematic cutscenes, lacked any head-up display elements as to play like a movie, and also featured an emotional connection between two characters despite the use of minimal dialog. He also cited Sega Mega Drive games, Virtua Fighter, Lemmings, Flashback and the original Prince of Persia games as influences, specifically regarding animation and gameplay style. With the help of an assistant, Ueda created an animation in Lightwave to get a feel for the final game and to better convey his vision. In the three-minute demonstration reel, Yorda had the horns instead of Ico, and flying robotic creatures were seen firing weapons to destroy the castle. Ueda stated that having this movie that represented his vision helped to keep the team on track for the long development process, and he reused this technique for the development of Shadow of the Colossus, the team's next effort.

Ueda began working with producer Kenji Kaido in 1998 to develop the idea and bring the game to the PlayStation. Icos design aesthetics were guided by three key notions: to make a game that would be different from others in the genre, feature an aesthetic style that would be consistently artistic, and play out in an imaginary yet realistic setting. This was achieved through the use of "subtracting design"; they removed elements from the game which interfered with the game's reality. This included removing any form of interface elements, keeping the gameplay focused only on the escape from the castle, and reducing the number of types of enemies in the game to a single foe. An interim design of the game shows Ico and Yorda facing horned warriors similar to those who take Ico to the castle. The game originally focused on Ico's attempt to return Yorda to her room in the castle after she was kidnapped by these warriors. Ueda believed this version had too much detail for the graphics engine they had developed, and as part of the "subtracting design", replaced the warriors with the shadow creatures. Ueda also brought in a number of people outside the video game industry to help with development. These consisted of two programmers, four artists, and one designer in addition to Ueda and Kaido, forming the base of what is now known as Team Ico. On reflection, Ueda noted that the subtracting design may have taken too much out of the game, and did not go to as great an extreme with Shadow of the Colossus.

After two years of development, the team ran into limitations on the PlayStation hardware and faced a critical choice: either terminate the project altogether, alter their vision to fit the constraints of the hardware, or continue to explore more options. The team decided to remain true to Ueda's vision, and began to use the Emotion Engine of the PlayStation 2, taking advantage of the improved abilities of the platform. Character animation was accomplished through key frame animation instead of the more common motion capture technique. The game took about four years to create. Ueda purposely left the ending vague, not stating whether Yorda was alive, whether she would travel with Ico, or if it was simply the protagonist's dream.

The cover used for releases in Japan and PAL regions was drawn by Ueda himself, and was inspired by the Italian artist Giorgio de Chirico and his work The Nostalgia of the Infinite. Ueda believed that "the surrealistic world of de Chirico matched the allegoric world of Ico". The North American version lacks this cover as well as additional features that become available after the player completes the game once. The development team was unable to provide Ueda's cover or the additional features such as the two-player mode in time for Sony's planned North American release date, but included them for the later releases in Japan and PAL regions. Since release, the North American cover has been considered one of the worst pieces of cover art for video games in contrast to the game's quality and the Japanese/PAL cover. On reflection, Yasuhide Kobayashi, vice-president of Sony's Japan Studio, believed the North American box art and lack of an identifiable English title led to the game's poor sales in the United States, and stated plans to correct that for the release of The Last Guardian. For its original release, a limited edition of the game was available in PAL regions that included a cardboard wrapping displaying artwork from the game and four art cards inside the box. The game was re-released as a standard edition in 2006 across all PAL regions except France after the 2005 release of Shadow of the Colossus, Icos spiritual sequel, to allow players to "fill the gap in their collection".

Ico uses minimal dialog in a fictional language to provide the story throughout the game. Voice actors included Kazuhiro Shindō as Ico, Rieko Takahashi as Yorda, and Misa Watanabe as the Queen. Ico and the Queen's words are presented in either English or Japanese subtitles depending on the release region, but Yorda's speech is presented in a symbolic language. Ueda opted not to provide the translation for Yorda's words as it would have overcome the language barrier between Ico and Yorda, and detracted from the "holding hands" concept of the game. In the non-North American releases, playing through the game again after completing the game replaces the symbolic text with appropriate language subtitles.

Other media

Soundtrack 

Icos audio featured a limited amount of music and sound effects. The soundtrack, was composed by Michiru Oshima and sound unit "pentagon" (Koichi Yamazaki & Mitsukuni Murayama) and released in Japan by Sony Music Entertainment on February 20, 2002. The album was distributed by Sony Music Entertainment Visual Works. The last song of the CD, "ICO -You Were There-", includes vocals sung by former Libera member Steven Geraghty.

Novelization
A novelization of the game titled  was released in Japan in 2004. Author Miyuki Miyabe wrote the novel because of her appreciation of the game. A Korean translation of the novel, entitled 이코 – 안개의 성 (I-ko: An-gae-eui Seong) came out the following year, by Hwangmae Publishers, while an English translation was published by Viz Media on August 16, 2011.

Cross title content
Costumes (including Ico and Yorda), stickers, and sound effects from Ico are part of an add-on pack for the game LittleBigPlanet, alongside similar materials from Shadow of the Colossus, after being teased by the game's developers Media Molecule about two weeks prior. Ico makes a cameo appearance in Astro's Playroom.

Film
In 2010, Misher Films said that a film adaption of Ico may come about based on the success of their then-planned adaptation of Shadow of the Colossus.

Reception 

Ico received critical acclaim, becoming a cult hit among players. The game has an aggregated review score of 90 out of 100 at Metacritic. In Japan, Famitsu magazine scored the PlayStation2 version of the game a 30 out of 40. The game is considered by some to be one of the greatest games of all time; Edge ranked Ico as the 13th top game in a 2007 listing, while IGN ranked the game at number 18 in 2005, and at number 57 in 2007. Ico has been used as an example of a game that is a work of art. Ueda commented that he purposely tried to distance Ico from conventional video games due to the negative image video games were receiving at that time, in order to draw more people to the title.

Some reviewers have likened Ico to older, simpler adventure games such as Prince of Persia or Tomb Raider, that seek to evoke an emotional experience from the player; IGNs David Smith commented that while simple, as an experience the game was "near indescribable." The game's graphics and sound contributed strongly to the positive reactions from critics; Smith continues that "The visuals, sound, and original puzzle design come together to make something that is almost, if not quite, completely unlike anything else on the market, and feels wonderful because of it." Many reviewers were impressed with the expansiveness and the details given to the environments, the animation used for the main characters despite their low polygon count, as well as the use of lighting effects. Icos ambiance, created by the simple music and the small attention to detail in the voice work of the main characters, were also called out as strong points for the game. Charles Herold of The New York Times summed up his review stating that "Ico is not a perfect game, but it is a game of perfect moments." Herold later commented that Ico breaks the mold of games that usually involve companions. In most games these companions are invulnerable and players will generally not concern with the non-playable characters' fate, but Ico creates the sense of "trust and childish fragility" around Yorda, which leads to the character being "the game's entire focus".

The game is noted for its simple combat system that would "disappoint those craving sheer mechanical depth", as stated by GameSpots Miguel Lopez. The game's puzzle design has been praised for creating a rewarding experience for players who work through challenges on their own; Kristen Reed of Eurogamer, for example, said that "you quietly, logically, willingly proceed, and the illusion is perfect: the game never tells you what to do, even though the game is always telling you what to do". Ico is also considered a short game, taking between seven and ten hours for a single play through, which Game Revolution calls "painfully short" with "no replay outside of self-imposed challenges". G4TV's Matthew Keil, however, felt that "the game is so strong, many will finish 'Ico' in one or two sittings". The lack of features in the North American release, which would become unlocked on subsequent playthroughs after completing the game, was said to reduce the replay value of the title. Electronic Gaming Monthly notes that "Yorda would probably be the worst companion -she's scatterbrained and helpless; if not for the fact that the player develops a bond with her, making the game's ending all the more heartrending."

Francesca Reyes reviewed the game for Next Generation, rating it four stars out of five, and stated that "Intensely involving and wonderfully simple, Ico, though flawed, deserves to find its niche as a quiet classic."

Despite the positive praise, the original title did not sell well. By 2009, only 700,000 copies were sold worldwide, with 270,000 in the United States, and the bulk in PAL regions. Ueda considered his design by subtraction approach may have hurt the marketing of the game, as at the time of the game's release, promotion of video games were primarily done through screenshots, and as Ico lacked any heads-up display, it appeared uninteresting to potential buyers.

Awards 
Ico received several acclamations from the video game press, and was considered to be one of the Games of the Year by many publications, despite competing with releases such as Halo, Metal Gear Solid 2: Sons of Liberty, and Grand Theft Auto III. The game received three Game Developers Choice Awards in 2002, including "Excellence in Level Design", "Excellence in Visual Arts", and "Game Innovation Spotlight". The game won two Interactive Achievement Awards from the Academy of Interactive Arts & Sciences in 2002 for "Art Direction" and "Character or Story Development", and was nominated for awards of "Game of the Year", "Game Design", "Level Design" and "Sound Design". It won GameSpots annual "Best Graphics, Artistic" prize among console games. It was one of three titles to win the Special Award at the sixth CESA Game Awards.

Legacy 
Ico influenced numerous other video games, which borrowed from its simple and visual design ideals. Several game designers, such as Eiji Aonuma, Hideo Kojima, and Jordan Mechner, have cited Ico as having influenced the visual appearance of their games, including The Legend of Zelda: Twilight Princess, Metal Gear Solid 3: Snake Eater, and Prince of Persia: The Sands of Time, respectively. Marc Laidlaw, scriptwriter for the Half-Life series, commented that, among several other more memorable moments in the game, the point where Yorda attempts to save Ico from falling off the damaged bridge was "a significant event not only for that game, but for the art of game design". The Naughty Dog team used Ico as part of the inspiration for developing Uncharted 3. Vander Caballero credits Ico for inspiring the gameplay of Papo & Yo. Phil Fish used the design by subtraction approach in developing the title Fez. The developers of both Brothers: A Tale of Two Sons and Rime have Ico as a core influence on their design. Hidetaka Miyazaki, creator and director of the Dark Souls series, cited Ico as a key influence to him becoming involved in developing video games, stating that Ico "awoke me to the possibilities of the medium". Goichi Suda aka Suda51, said that Ico save game method, where the player has Ico and Yorda sit on a bench to save the game, inspired the save game method in No More Heroes where the player-character sits on a toilet to save the game.

Ico was one of the first video games to use a bloom lighting effect, which later became a popular effect in video games. Patrice Désilets, creator of Ubisoft games such as Prince of Persia: The Sands of Time and Assassin's Creed, cited Ico as an influence on the game design of The Sands of Time. Jenova Chen, creator of art games such as Flower and Journey, cited Ico as one of his biggest influences. Ico was also cited as an influence by Halo 4 creative director Josh Holmes. Naughty Dog said The Last of Us was influenced by Ico, particularly in terms of character building and interaction, and Neil Druckmann credited the gameplay of Ico as a key inspiration when he began developing the story of The Last of Us.

Film director Guillermo del Toro cited both Ico and Shadow of the Colossus as "masterpieces" and part of his directorial influence. Jonny Greenwood of Radiohead considers, of his top ten video games, "Ico might be the best one".

Other Team Ico games 

, released for the PlayStation 2 in October 2005 in Japan and North America, was developed by the same team that developed Ico. The game features similar graphics, gameplay, and storytelling elements as Ico. The game was referred by its working title "Nico" ("Ni" being Japanese for the number 2") until the final title was revealed. Ueda, when asked about the connection between the two games, stated that Shadow of the Colossus is a prequel to Ico.

Team Ico's third game, The Last Guardian, was announced as a PlayStation 3 title at the Electronic Entertainment Expo 2009. The game centers on the connection between a young boy and a large griffin-like creature that he befriends, requiring the player to cooperate with the creature to solve the game's puzzles. The game fell into development hell due to hardware limitations and the departure of Ueda from Sony around 2012, along with other Team Ico members, though Ueda and the other members continued to work on the game via consulting contracts. Development subsequently switched to the PlayStation 4 in 2012, and the game was reannounced in 2015 and released in December 2016. Ueda has said that "the essence of the game is rather close to Ico".

HD remaster

Ico, along with Shadow of the Colossus, received a high-definition remaster for the PlayStation3 that was released worldwide in September 2011. In addition to improved graphics, the games were updated to include support for stereoscopic 3D and PlayStation Trophies. The Ico port was also based on the European version, and includes features such as Yorda's translation and the two-player mode. In North America and Europe/PAL regions, the two games were released as a single retail collection, while in Japan, they were released as separate titles. Both games have since been released separately as downloadable titles on the PlayStation Network store. Patch 1.01 for the digital high-definition Ico version added the Remote Play feature, allowing the game to be played on the PlayStation Vita.

References

External links 
  (North America)
 Ico at MobyGames
 Early development video assembled by GenDesign

2001 video games
Action-adventure games
Art games
Video games about curses
Fantasy video games
Cancelled PlayStation (console) games
Cooperative video games
Interactive Achievement Award winners
Video games about magic
Novels based on video games
PlayStation 2 games
Fiction about sacrifices
Sony Interactive Entertainment games
Video games about spirit possession
Video games developed in Japan
Video games featuring female protagonists
Video games featuring non-playable protagonists
Video games with stereoscopic 3D graphics
Video games scored by Michiru Ōshima
Video games set in castles
Viz Media novels
Game Developers Choice Award winners